Truckload shipping is the movement of large amounts of homogeneous cargo, generally the amount necessary to fill an entire semi-trailer or intermodal container. A truckload carrier is a trucking company that generally contracts an entire trailer-load to a single customer. This is as opposed to a less-than truckload (LTL) company that generally mixes freight from several customers in each trailer. One advantage Full Truckload (FTL) carriers have over Less than Truckload carriers is that the freight is never handled en route, whereas an LTL shipment will typically be transported on several different trailers. Truckload shipments are typically run on 48' or 53'dry van trailers which will hold 24 or 26 pallets respectively.

Responsibilities
Truckload is used for larger shipments of freight. If the number of items is large, a 48’ or 53’ capacity trailer will not be enough for shipping products. In such a case, truckload shipping is the best method to reduce cost, transport goods quicker and reduce damage. The shipment will be cost-effective if it is large enough to require the use of the space of the trailer. Truckload shipping will also be more beneficial than booking multiple LTL (less than truckload) shipments.

There are three types of truckload shipment — dry van, flatbed, and refrigerated. During the time of filling the entire trailer, "full truckload" should be selected. This is ideal for large shipments. If the freight does not need the entire space of a truck, it is called LTL. On the other hand, the entire space or weight limit of a trailer is required for a full truckload (FTL) shipments. Efficiency and productivity of the package can also be improved in truckload shipping. Compared to LTL, selecting full truckload will be cost-effective when the weight is high. Full-truckload freight is very fast because it is sent to the chosen destination directly. Thus transit time is less.

Packaging
Freight is usually loaded onto pallets for unit loads. Sturdy shipping containers such as crates or corrugated fiberboard boxes are commonly used. Carriers have published tariffs that provide some guidance for packaging. Packaging engineers design and test packaging to meet the specific needs of the logistics system and the product being shipped.

Truckload shipments are sometimes broken down into individual containers and further shipped by LTL or express carriers. Packaging for TL often needs to withstand the more severe handling of individual shipments. A typical full truckload for a dry van trailer consists of 24 standard pallets of cargo that weighs up to 45,000 lbs. (or more).

History

When the US Interstate Highway System expanded in the 1950s, the trucking industry took over a large market share of transportation of goods throughout the country. Before this era, railroads had transported the bulk of goods country wide. The Interstate Highway System allowed merchandise to travel door to door much more easily. Since then, truckload carriers have utilized the interstate system to transport merchandise across the country. They typically will bring the merchandise from the distribution center in one area of the country to a distribution center in a different part of the country. The increase in truckload freight transportation has reduced the amount of time taken to transport goods where the freight was manufactured or produced to the different areas around the nation.

Sources
 Constantin, James A. and Hudson, William J.. Motor Transportation: Principles and Practices. The Ronal Press Company. New York, 1958. Pages 149–154.
 Bardi, Joseph E., Coyle, John J., and Langley, John C. Jr..The Management of Business Logistics: A Supply Chain Perspective. Cengage Learning, 2000. Pages 45–58, 67–81.
 McKinlay, A. H., "Transport Packaging", IoPP, 2004 
 Fiedler, R. M, "Distribution Packaging Technology", IoPP, 1995
 PJ Logistics Agency, truckload; https://pjlogisticsagency.com/truckload-1 ,2021

External links
 Mirriam Webster definition of truckload

Freight transport